Igreja da Graça  is a church in Santarém, Portugal. It is classified as a National Monument.

Churches in Santarém District
National monuments in Santarém District